The Basawakkulama inscription or Abhayavāpī inscription is a rock-cut record, probably from the time of king Upatissa, documenting the gift of two villages and some agricultural land to a Buddhist establishment in the late fourth century C.E. The inscription is at Anuradhapura.

Location
The inscription is reported to be incised on a rock about a quarter of a mile to the north of the spill of the Basavakkuḷama (Basawakkulama) at Anurādhapura. The Basavakkuḷama is reputed to be one of the earliest irrigation works in ancient Sri Lanka and anciently known as the Abhaya Wewa or Abhayavāpī.

Publication
The inscription was first published in 1960 by Senarath Paranavitana as part of an article dealing with Sri Lankan history entitled "New Light on the Buddhist Era in Ceylon and Early Sinhalese Chronology," in the University of Ceylon Review, volume 20, pp. 129–55. The record does not seem to have been re-edited subsequently.

Description and Contents
The inscription is engraved on a rock surface, covering an area 4 ft. 7 in by 2 ft. 9 in. in 11 lines. The  individual letters are 1 1/4 in. to 4 in. high. The purport of the inscription is to record the king's donation of land and two villages in the twenty-eighth year of his reign. The name Budadasa (=Buddhadāsa) and the work puta (= Sanskrit putra, son) are preserved, so the record probably belongs to Upatissa.

Translation
Success. The mahārāja [*Upatissa] , bearing the name ... [reading unclear], son of mahārāja Budadasa (=Buddhadāsa), having founded the Upatisa raja maha vihara (at a place) half a krośa ahead of the city gate, the gate of the archway, the gate of the watch-tower, and the monumental column, which he himself caused to be constructed, granted to this Doraka vihāra (=Dvāraka vihāra) the village of Diratigama and Dasagama for the benefit of the uposatha house and sixty karīsas of field from the Mahanelaka-vaḷa (in the village of) Kabota-agaṇa for the benefit of the Bodhi-shrine (having had these) acquired from the minister Nakaragal Keḷela, giving him the varupota of Kanaketa, and having (the grant) registered as perpetual in the administrative offices, on Tuesday the first day of the Duratu new-moon in the month of ...... in the twenty-eighth year of the raising of the umbrella (being) the year nine-hundred and forty one in the era of the Parinirvāṇa of the Blessed Buddha ...

See also

Irrigation works in ancient Sri Lanka
Abhayavapi

References

External links
Inscriptions of Sri Lanka
Boyacı Ustası

Anuradhapura period
Sri Lanka inscriptions